Irving William Leonard Ormiston (19 June 1895 – 29 August 1969) was a rugby union player who represented Australia.

Ormiston, a flanker, was born in Cowra, New South Wales and claimed a total of 3 international rugby caps for Australia.

References

1895 births
1969 deaths
People from Cowra
Rugby union players from New South Wales
Rugby union flankers
Australian rugby union players
Australia international rugby union players